Diafana Krina (Greek: Διάφανα Κρίνα, which translates in English as 'Translucent Lilies') was a Greek rock group. It consisted of Thanos Anestopoulos (vocals, acoustic guitar, piano), Pantelis Rodostoglou (bass), Nikos Bardis (electric guitar, trumpet), Kyriakos Tsoukalas (electric guitar), Tassos Machas (drums) and (from 1996 until 2000) Panagiotis Berlis (keyboards, vocals). Their special characteristic (apart from their distinct baritone voice of Anestopoulos) is that they set to music poems (most written by bassist Rodostoglou) rather than usual lyrics.

History
Diafana Krina, Greek for "translucent lilies," formed in 1991. In 1994, they released their first single 'Λιώνοντας μόνος-κάτω από το ηφαίστειο' (Greek for "Melting alone-under the volcano") by Wipe Out. They followed this in 1996 with the LP 'Έγινε η απώλεια συνήθειά μας', which featured Panagiotis Berlis (keyboards/vocals) as the sixth member of the group. In 1997, they  participated in the 'Rock of Gods' festival in Athens together with The Sisters of Mercy and New Model Army. In 1998, they released their second LP 'Κάτι σαράβαλες καρδιές' and performed in several concerts around Greece. They also toured as a supporting act for the Tindersticks Athens concert. In 2000, after Panagiotis Berlis departed from the group, they released a single 'Είναι που όλα ήρθαν αργά' and album 'Ευωδιάζουν αγριοκέρασα οι σιωπές'. In 2001, they performed three concerts in the UK: (London at Dingwalls, Manchester at The Roadhouse and Brighton at Concorde 2). In 2003, the LP 'Ο,τι απόμεινε απ' την ευτυχία' was released, followed by the 2005 instrumental LP 'Ο γύρος της μέρας σε 80 κόσμους' (Greek for "Around the day in 80 worlds", inspired by the title of Jules Verne's famous story Around the World in Eighty Days). It was released together with a book containing poetry and tales. On June 1st 2009, the band announced their disbandment. The statement was signed by all band members apart from Anestopoulos.

Anestopoulos succumbed to cancer in September 2016.

Discography

Studio albums
 Egine i apolia synithia mas (Έγινε η απώλεια συνήθειά μας - Loss became our habit) - 1996
 Kati saravales kardies (Κάτι σαράβαλες καρδιές - Some Wrecked Hearts) - 1998
 Evodiazoun agriokerasa i siopes (Ευωδιάζουν αγριοκέρασα οι σιωπές - Silence Gives the Odour of Wild Cherries) - 2000
 Oti apomine ap tin eftihia (Ο,τι απόμεινε απ' την ευτυχία - All that's left of happiness) - 2003
 O giros tis meras se 80 kosmous (Ο γύρος της μέρας σε 80 κόσμους - Around the Day in 80 Worlds) - 2005
 Ki i agapi pali tha kali (Κι η αγάπη πάλι θα καλεί -And love will be calling again) - 2008

EP
 Lionontas Monos/Kato apo to ifaistio (Λιώνοντας μόνος / Κάτω απ’ το ηφαίστειο - Melting Alone / Under the Volcano) - 1994
 Ine pou ola irthan arga (Είναι που όλα ήρθαν αργά - It's that everything came late) - 2000
 Kainourios Topos / Kato apo to ifaistio - (Καινούργιος τόπος / Κάτω απ’ το ηφαίστειο - New Land / Under the volcano)   - 2001

External links
Diafana Krina
Splendid Review
Official Website

Greek rock music groups
Musical groups established in 1990
Musical groups disestablished in 2009